Nikolayevka is a rural locality (a selo) in Ivanovo-Nikolayvsky Selsoviet of Yenotayevsky District, Astrakhan Oblast, Russia. The population was 418 as of 2010. There are 5 streets.

Geography 
Nikolayevka is located 6 km north of Yenotayevka (the district's administrative centre) by road. Ivanovka is the nearest rural locality.

References 

Rural localities in Yenotayevsky District